Voyage is a 2013 film by the acclaimed Hong Kong film-maker Scud, the production-crediting name of Danny Cheng Wan-Cheung. It is described as "a tragic story about love, fate and the struggle of losing loved ones", and received its world premiere on 20 October 2013 at the Chicago International Film Festival. It was filmed in Hong Kong, Mongolia, Malaysia, Australia, Germany and the Netherlands, and is the director's first film partially made outside Asia, and also his first to be filmed mostly in the English language. It explores several themes traditionally regarded as 'taboo' in Hong Kong society in an unusually open, convention-defying way, and features full-frontal male nudity in several scenes. It is the fifth of seven publicly released films by Scud. The six other films are: City Without Baseball in 2008, Permanent Residence in 2009, Amphetamine in 2010, Love Actually... Sucks! in 2011, Utopians in 2015 and Thirty Years of Adonis in 2017. The eighth film, Apostles, was made in 2022, as was the ninth, Bodyshop, but neither have yet been released. The tenth and final film, Naked Nations: Hong Kong Tribe, is currently in production.

Plot
Voyage centres on a young psychiatrist (played by Ryo van Kooten) who leaves Hong Kong to embark on a long lone voyage from Hong Kong along the coast of South-East Asia to try to overcome the emotional turmoil he has experienced in his relationships with former clients. While travelling, he tries to come to terms with his experiences by making a detailed record of their stories, and decides to visit those places himself.

The film's director, Scud, explained that the idea for the film "originated from my own thoughts about suicide. One time, I had thought about walking into the central Australian desert until I am exhausted and die in a miserable way. These thoughts caused me to think about similar people in this situation." He continued that "All of the episodes are independent of each other and the stories are based on real experiences which some of the actors appearing in the film have gone through. Having an international cast and locations around the world is appropriate because depression and suicide are universal themes".

Main cast
 Ryo van Kooten  ... Ryo
 Sebastian Castro  ... Sebastian
 Adrian Ron Heung  ... Adrian
 Leon Hill	  ... Ryo's Father
 Haze Leung	  ... Ming
 Byron Pang  ... Yuan
 Jason Poon	  ... Jip
 Debra Baker	  ... Suzanna Schwaering
 Siu Yam-yam ... Lady Red
 Linda So	  ... Linda So
 Leni Speidel	  ... Leni

Making of Voyage

Filming of Voyage began in September 2011 in the city of Hanover in Germany, and was Scud's first film set outside Asia. It stars the Peruvian-Japanese American actor, singer and visual artist Sebastian Castro, very popular in Asia, who was also commissioned to produce some original art for the film.

Voyage features many of Scud's colleagues from previous films, such as the actors Byron Pang, Haze Leung, Adrian "Ron" Heung, and Linda So, as well as several technical staff, such as the Director of Photography, Charlie Lam, who worked on Scud's 2010 film Amphetamine. During filming, Scud said, "I am really enjoying shooting in Europe because people are so film-friendly.. I can see myself coming back to film again in Europe". The German episode includes appearances by the UK actress Debra Baker (Junkhearts) and the German actress Leni Speidel, who was also the Production Manager for filming in Europe.

DVD
A two-disc Sky Digi Entertainment (Taiwan) edition of Voyage was released internationally on DVD on 29 September 2014.

Films by the same director/producer

See also
 List of Hong Kong films of 2013
 List of lesbian, gay, bisexual or transgender-related films
 List of lesbian, gay, bisexual, or transgender-related films by storyline
 Nudity in film (East Asian cinema since 1929)

References

External links

2013 drama films
2013 LGBT-related films
2013 films
2010s Cantonese-language films
Chinese independent films
Chinese LGBT-related films
Films directed by Scud (filmmaker)
Films set in Hong Kong
Gay-related films
English-language Hong Kong films
Hong Kong independent films
Hong Kong LGBT-related films
LGBT-related drama films
Male bisexuality in film
2010s Hong Kong films